Side Lake is an unincorporated community in French Township, Saint Louis County, Minnesota, United States.

The community is located 20 miles north of the city of Hibbing on Saint Louis County Highway 5 (CR 5).

McCarthy Beach State Park is nearby.

References

 Rand McNally Road Atlas – 2007 edition – Minnesota entry
 Official State of Minnesota Highway Map – 2011/2012 edition

External links
Community of Side Lake

Unincorporated communities in Minnesota
Unincorporated communities in St. Louis County, Minnesota
Mining communities in Minnesota